Randor Bierd (born March 14, 1984) is an American former professional baseball relief pitcher. He played in Major League Baseball (MLB) for the Baltimore Orioles.

Career

Detroit Tigers

Bierd was originally signed by the Detroit Tigers as an undrafted free agent on June 3, . Pitching in a total of 42 games (three starts), Bierd went 4–3 with a 2.93 ERA.

Baltimore Orioles

On December 6, 2007, Bierd was selected by the Baltimore Orioles as the third overall pick in the major league phase of the Rule 5 draft. Bierd made the Orioles  opening day roster as a relief pitcher. On April 2, 2008, Bierd made his major league debut against the Tampa Bay Rays, and pitched two scoreless innings. On May 2, 2008, he was placed on the 15-day disabled list with a sore right shoulder. On July 19, Bierd was activated from the disabled list. In 29 games with the Orioles, he went 0–2 with a 4.91 ERA while striking out 25 batters in 36.2 innings pitched.

Boston Red Sox

On January 19, Bierd was traded to the Boston Red Sox for David Pauley.  Bierd spent the 2009 baseball season with the Triple-A Pawtucket Red Sox, achieving a 3–1 record with a 4.55 ERA as both a starter and reliever.  

On July 22, 2010, Bierd was released by the Red Sox. He spent the 2010–2011 offseason pitching winter baseball in the Dominican League for Leones del Escogido.

Coaching career 
Bierd was named as the pitching coach of the DSL Pirates for the 2019 season.

See also
Rule 5 draft results

References and notes

External links

1984 births
Living people
Baltimore Orioles players
Bowie Baysox players
Dominican Republic expatriate baseball players in the United States
Erie SeaWolves players
Frederick Keys players
Gigantes del Cibao players
Gulf Coast Orioles players
Gulf Coast Tigers players
Lakeland Tigers players
Leones del Escogido players
Major League Baseball pitchers
Major League Baseball players from the Dominican Republic
Mesa Solar Sox players
Minor league baseball coaches
Oneonta Tigers players
Pawtucket Red Sox players
Sportspeople from Santo Domingo
West Michigan Whitecaps players